"Who's Laughing Now" is a song by American singer Ava Max, released on July 30, 2020, through Atlantic Records as the sixth single from her debut studio album, Heaven & Hell (2020). The song was written by Max, Madison Love, Måns Wredenberg, Noonie Bao, and producers Cirkut and Lotus IV. It is a dance-pop song with lyrics about a girl being gaslighted, and continues from Max's 2018 song "Sweet but Psycho". "Who's Laughing Now" reached number one in Poland, and charted in the top ten in eight countries. An accompanying music video was directed by Isaac Rentz and depicts Max seeking revenge on her boss and cheating boyfriend.

Background and development
Max first teased "Who's Laughing Now" on her social media accounts on May 28, 2020, before officially announcing the single's initial June 2, 2020 release date, and cover art the next day. The release date was subsequently postponed because it coincided with Blackout Tuesday. She then announced that the song would be released on June 25, 2020, but was also indefinitely delayed on June 17, 2020. She eventually announced that it would be released on July 30, 2020. The cover art depicts a topless Max positioned in front of a flaming background. "Who's Laughing Now" was written by Max, Madison Love, Måns Wredenberg, Noonie Bao, Cirkut and Lotus IV, with the latter two handling production.

Composition and critical reception
"Who's Laughing Now" is a dance-pop song, which contains several minor chords. Neil Z. Yeung of AllMusic compared the song's island groove to artists such as Clean Bandit and Ace of Base. It was written as a continuation from her 2018 song "Sweet but Psycho", as the lyrics both describe a misunderstood girl being gaslighted, and serve as an analogy to Max's own experiences being rejected in the music industry. She summarized the song as "basically telling everyone to just fuck off". Max stated that "Who's Laughing Now" is targeted towards females who had bullied her throughout middle school, causing her to start home-school. The song's title was envisioned after a self-discovery revelation by Max.

Writing for Us Weekly, Nicholas Hautman praised the chorus of "Who's Laughing Now", indicating that it had the catchiest "don't cha" since the Pussycat Dolls song "Don't Cha" (2005). However, Issy Sampson of The Guardian criticized the song for sounding similar to "Sweet but Psycho", which she described as an "irritating earworm". She added that the former used a "smug" horrible personality trait in place of "psychotic."

Music video
The music video was directed by Isaac Rentz and released on July 30, 2020. Max is depicted as a person seeking revenge after being fired by her boss and cheated on by her boyfriend. She is seen dancing in a destroyed office and breaking a car with a crowbar, before breaking free of a psychiatric hospital while strapped in a straitjacket. Max wrote the video's plot, which she decided to incorporate several female characters into a corporate workforce dominated by men. One character portrayed by Max is gaslighted by a doctor into becoming "psycho", while another had musical instruments appearing from her head, which was parallel to her own negative experiences with music executives. An interactive quiz was launched as a collaboration with Spotify prior to the release of Max's debut studio album Heaven & Hell (2020). It contains 10 questions asking about personality, resulting in the choice of one of four characters portrayed in the music video; Amanda, Torrence, Carmen, and Ava.

Track listings

Digital download / Streaming
 "Who's Laughing Now" 3:00

Digital download / streaming – The Remixes
 "Who's Laughing Now" (Breathe Carolina Remix) 2:24
 "Who's Laughing Now" (Cat Dealers Remix) 3:40

Digital download / streaming – The Remixes
 "Who's Laughing Now" (KOLIDESCOPES Remix) 3:20
 "Who's Laughing Now" (COASTR. Remix) 3:36
 "Who's Laughing Now" (Jordan Jay Remix) 2:34

Streaming
 "Who's Laughing Now" (Breathe Carolina Remix) 2:24
 "Who's Laughing Now" (Cat Dealers Remix) 3:40
 "Who's Laughing Now" 3:00

Streaming
 "Who's Laughing Now" (KOLIDESCOPES Remix) 3:20
 "Who's Laughing Now" (COASTR. Remix) 3:36
 "Who's Laughing Now" (Jordan Jay Remix) 2:34
 "Who's Laughing Now" (Breathe Carolina Remix) 2:24
 "Who's Laughing Now" (Cat Dealers Remix) 3:40
 "Who's Laughing Now" 3:00

Personnel
Credits adapted from Tidal.

 Amanda Ava Koci vocals, songwriting
 Henry Walter songwriting, production, programming
 Linus Wiklund songwriting, production, programming
 Madison Love songwriting
 Måns Wredenberg songwriting
 Jonnali Parmenius songwriting
 Chris Gehringer mastering
 Serban Ghenea mixing

 John Hanes engineering

Charts

Weekly charts

Year-end charts

Certifications

Release history

Footnotes

References

2020 singles
2020 songs
Atlantic Records singles
Ava Max songs
Number-one singles in Poland
Songs written by Ava Max
Songs written by Noonie Bao
Songs written by Linus Wiklund
Songs written by Madison Love
Songs written by Cirkut (record producer)
Song recordings produced by Cirkut (record producer)